Futuna Airport  is an airfield on the island of Futuna, in the Taféa province in Vanuatu.

Airlines and destinations

References

External links
 

Airports in Vanuatu
Tafea Province